High School Rapper 3 (Hangul: 고등래퍼3) is the third season of a popular South Korean survival hip-hop TV show, High School Rapper. The new season was announced on December 5, 2018. It aired on Mnet starting from February 22, 2019. The show featured young rappers born between 2000 and 2003.

Season overview

Mentors groups 
Giriboy & Kid Milli

Hangzoo & Boi B

The Quiett & Code Kunst

GroovyRoom.

Contestants 
The contestants were sorted by the grade they attend in school.

Episodes

Episode 1 
The contestants began the first round of cyphers. Each class went up and took turns, then were graded by their peers for a "first place" in each grade.

Unlike last year, there were three preliminary high school students and many high school seniors, so they were divided into groups (high school 1+ preliminary high school 1), high school 2A, and high school 3B.

 Preliminary Class 1 and Grade 1 were combined to make a group of 8 contestants.

 Each winning contestant became the leader of a team, each picking 7 contestants to join them.

 Indicates student performance not shown.

Episode 2 - 3 
Each team of contestants rapped and were scored by the mentors: Giriboy & Kid Milli, Hangzoo & Boi B, The Quiett & Code Kunst, and GroovyRoom.

Only 3 contestants could move on to the next round.

 Indicates student performance not shown.

● Yoon Seok-jun had a headache and was not able to perform.

The teams (now with 3 members) choose their mentor duo.

 Giriboy & Kid Milli Team: Kwon Young-hoon, Kang Hyeon-jun, Choi Jin-ho
GroovyRoom Team: Yang Seung-ho, Ha Seon-ho, Oh Dong-hwan
 The Quiett & Code Kunst Team: Lee Young-ji, Song Min-jae, Yoon Hyeon-seon
Hangzoo & Boi B Team: Lee Jin-woo, Kang Min-su, Seo Min-gyu

Once the teams chose their mentors, the mentors were allowed to save one eliminated contestant to join the team.

 Hangzoo & Boi B Team: Choi Jin-sung
 GroovyRoom Team: Kim Hyeon-seong
 Giriboy & Kid Milli Team: Kim Ho-jin
 The Quiett & Code Kunst Team: Kim Min-gyu

Episode 4 - 5 
The teams split into pairs and create a rap based on a poem or novel. The pairs face off, eliminating half of the contestants based on scores from the audience.

The mentors are allowed to save one contestant from each of their eliminated pairs.

 Hangzoo & Boi B Team: Seo Min-gyu
 GroovyRoom Team: Yang Seung-ho & Ha Seon-ho
 Giriboy & Kid Milli Team: Kang Hyeon-jun

Episode 5 - 6 
The teams split up to rap with one of their mentors for a collaboration rap. The scoring for each stage is out of 200 points from a group of 8 guest judges: H2ADIN & WEBSTER B, Coogie & Zizo, Ja Mezz & KillaGramz, and Nada & Giant Pink.

The total scores from the guest judge's 200 points and the audience's 300 points were totalled, and the 2 lowest scoring contestants/pairs were eliminated.

Episode 7 
This is the semi-final round, where each of the 9 remaining contestants has a solo stage (with or without a featuring artist). Only 5 seats remain open to proceed to the finals.

During the last 20 seconds of each performance, the audience voting was hidden, and the full score was revealed at the end of the semi-final.

*Scoring Error* 
During the semi-final, there was a scoring error, where the last 20 seconds of Kwon Young-hoon's performance weren't fully counted. Since he was overtaken for the last available seat in the finals, the mentors agreed that he should be allowed to advance with the other 5 contestants. His original score of 362 became 376.

Episode 8 
This is the final round, where each of the 6 remaining contestants has a solo stage (with or without a featuring artist).

The results were followed by a special stage performance from some of the contestants that had been eliminated.

 "Winner" - Kim Ho-jin (Hotchkiss), Oh Dong-hwan (Untell), Yoon Hyeon-seon (GI$T), and Choi Jin-sung (Goi)

Later, a winner single was released.

 "READY" - Lee Young-ji (feat. The Quiett)

Ratings

References 

 "고등래퍼 3 - 나무위키". namu.wiki. Retrieved 2020-03-29.

South Korean music television shows
2010s South Korean television series
Korean-language television shows
Music competitions in South Korea
Mnet (TV channel) original programming
Rapping
Hip hop television